Harimoto (written: 張本) is a Japanese surname. Notable people with the surname include:

, Japanese baseball player of Korean descent
, Chinese-born Japanese basketball player
, Japanese table tennis player of Chinese descent

Japanese-language surnames